Warmerdam is a Dutch surname that may refer to

Alex van Warmerdam (born 1952), Dutch screenwriter, film director, and actor
Cornelius Warmerdam (1915–2001), American pole vaulter 
Django Warmerdam (born 1995), Dutch football midfielder 
Marijke van Warmerdam (born 1959), Dutch photographer, installation artist, and video artist
Max Warmerdam (born 2000), Dutch chess player

Dutch-language surnames